Geri is a town in Cyprus,  south-east of the capital Nicosia. In 2001, it had a  population of 6,643. , its population was 8,235. Following a referendum in 2011, Geri has become a municipality.

References

Municipalities in Nicosia District